The 2018–19 Ukrainian Amateur Cup season was scheduled to start on August 22, 2018.

The cup holders FC LNZ-Lebedyn were defeated by FC Dnipro in quarterfinals.

Participated clubs
In bold are clubs that are active at the same season AAFU championship (parallel round-robin competition).

 Cherkasy Oblast: LNZ-Lebedyn
 Chernihiv Oblast (3): Fortuna Komarivka, FC Chernihiv, Avanhard Koryukivka
 Dnipropetrovsk Oblast (3): VPK-Ahro Shevchenkivka, Peremoha Dnipro, FC Dnipro
 Donetsk Oblast (2): Forum-Avto Kramatorsk, Sapfir Kramatorsk
 Ivano-Frankivsk Oblast (3): Naftovyk Dolyna, Karpaty Halych, Pokuttia Kolomyia
 Kharkiv Oblast (2): FC Vovchansk, Univer-Dynamo Kharkiv
 Kherson Oblast (3): Chornyanka-Ahrosport, Kolos Askania-Nova, Tavriya Novotroitske
 Kirovohrad Oblast: UkrAhroKom Holovkivka
 Kyiv Oblast (5): Atlet Kyiv, Dzhuniors Shpytky, Avanhard Bziv, Rubikon-Vyshneve, DH Shevchenkivske Denykhivka
 Luhansk Oblast: Skif Shulhynka

 Lviv Oblast (4): FC Mykolaiv, Yunist Verkhnya Bilka, Rochyn Sosnivka, SCC Demnya
 Poltava Oblast: Olimpia Savyntsi
 Rivne Oblast (3): Izotop-RAES Varash, ODEK Orzhiv, Mayak Sarny
 Sumy Oblast (2): Veleten Hlukhiv, Viktoriya Mykolaivka
 Ternopil Oblast (2): Zbruch-Ahrobiznes Pidvolochysk, DSO-Podillya
 Vinnytsia Oblast (2): Svitanok-Ahrosvit Shliakhova, Fakel Lypovets
 Volyn Oblast (2): LSTM 536 Lutsk, Votrans Lutsk
 Zakarpattia Oblast (2): SC Vilkhivtsi, Sevlyush Vynohradiv

Competition schedule

Preliminary round
First games will be played on 22 August and seconds on 29 August.

|}
First games will be played on 22 August and seconds on 5 September.

|}
First games will be played on 29 August and seconds on 5 September.

|}

Twenty two other teams will join 10 winners of the preliminary round.

Round of 32
First games will be played on 12 September and seconds on 19 September. The draw results were announced on 6 September 2018.

|}

Round of 16
First games will be played on 3 October and seconds on 10 October.

|}

Quarterfinals
First games will be played on 24 October and seconds on 31 October.

|}

Semifinals
First games will be played on 24 April 2019 and seconds on 1 May 2019.

|}

Final
First games will be played on 18 May 2019 and seconds on 8 June 2019.

|}

See also
 2018–19 Ukrainian Football Amateur League
 2018–19 Ukrainian Cup

Notes

References

External links
 Official website of the Association of Amateur Football of Ukraine (AAFU)

Ukrainian Amateur Cup
Ukrainian Amateur Cup
Amateur Cup